Elmira Urumbayeva (born 3 October 1973) is a Uzbekistani alpine skier. She competed in the women's slalom at the 2002 Winter Olympics.

References

1973 births
Living people
Uzbekistani female alpine skiers
Olympic alpine skiers of Uzbekistan
Alpine skiers at the 2002 Winter Olympics
Alpine skiers at the 1996 Asian Winter Games
Alpine skiers at the 1999 Asian Winter Games